The 2017 North Texas Mean Green football team represented University of North Texas in the 2017 NCAA Division I FBS football season. The Mean Green played their home games at the Apogee Stadium in Denton, Texas, as members of the West Division of Conference USA (C-USA). They were led by second-year head coach Seth Littrell. The Mean Green finished the season 9–5, 7–1 in C-USA play to win the West Division. They lost the C-USA Championship Game to Florida Atlantic. They received an invite to the New Orleans Bowl where they lost to Troy.

Recruiting

Position key

2017 Commitments
The Mean Green signed a total of 19 recruits.

Schedule
North Texas announced its 2017 football schedule on January 26, 2017. The 2017 schedule consists of 6 home and away games in the regular season. The Mean Green will host CUSA foes Old Dominion, UAB, UTEP, and UTSA, and will travel to Florida Atlantic, Louisiana Tech, Rice, and Southern Miss.

The Mean Green will host two of the four non-conference opponents, Army, which is independent from any conference, and Lamar from the Southland Conference and travel to Iowa from the Big Ten Conference and SMU from the American Athletic Conference.

Schedule Source:

Game summaries

Lamar

at SMU

at Iowa

UAB

The win over UAB is the 500th overall victory in program history for the Mean Green.

at Southern Miss

UTSA

at Florida Atlantic

Old Dominion

at Louisiana Tech

UTEP

With the victory, the Mean Green won the C-USA West division and will play in the conference championship game.

Army

The Mean Green outlasted the Black Knights with a 52–49 victory, with Trevor Moore kicking a game winning 39-yard field goal for North Texas. With the win, the Mean Green finished the 2017 season with a home record of 6–0, their first undefeated record at home since the 2003 season. Army only completed one pass during the entire game, with Ahmad Bradshaw throwing a 27-yard pass to John Trainor in the 3rd quarter.

at Rice

at Florida Atlantic – C-USA Championship Game

Troy – New Orleans Bowl

Awards
 2017 C-USA Football Coaches Preseason Award: Defense Nate Brooks Jr. and Kishawn McClain, Sr.

Coaching changes
 linebackers coach Mike Ekeler has left for North Carolina
 OL coach Brad Davis has left for Florida

Players moving to NFL 

 The following players signed as free agents following the 2017 NFL Draft

References

North Texas
North Texas Mean Green football seasons
North Texas Mean Green football